Harvey John Smith (born 29 December 1938) is a former British show jumping champion.

Smith was born in the West Riding of Yorkshire, and still maintains his stables at Craiglands Farm, High Eldwick, Bingley, near Bradford. He stood out from the ranks of showjumpers because of his broad accent and blunt manner.  His career was often controversial: in 1971 he was disciplined (overturned on appeal) after he gave a "V sign" to the judges following a near-perfect round which won him the British Show Jumping Derby for the second year in succession; this act also earned him a 'tongue-in-cheek' part in an advert for Victory V sweets with the slogan 'They've got a kick like a mule!' The expression "Doing a Harvey Smith" entered the English language for giving a V sign.

Smith became so famous that he embarked on a brief, but unsuccessful, singing career.  In 1975 he released a record with picture sleeve called True Love/End of the World on Handkerchief HANKY 3.  The record failed to chart.

His sons, Robert and Steven, also became equestrian champions.

Competing in two Summer Olympics, Smith's best finish was fourth in the individual show jumping event at Munich in 1972. He later became a television commentator for the British Broadcasting Corporation, doing equestrian coverage at the 1984 Summer Olympics in Los Angeles.

In 1989 Smith was honoured for being the first man to have jumped in 100 Volvo World Cup Qualifying Rounds.

During the 1970s in his spare time he competed in professional wrestling.

In 1990, after retiring from competition, Harvey joined with wife and trainer Sue Smith, a former showjumper herself, to form a racing team at their Yorkshire base, Craiglands Farm. Their charge Auroras Encore won the 2013 Grand National.

References

External links
Horse & Hound

1938 births
Living people
People from Bingley
Olympic equestrians of Great Britain
British male equestrians
Equestrians at the 1968 Summer Olympics
Equestrians at the 1972 Summer Olympics
British show jumping riders
English male equestrians
English male professional wrestlers
Sportspeople from Yorkshire